Wilbur J. Cohen Federal Building (formerly the Social Security Administration Building) is a historic building at 330 Independence Avenue, Southwest, Washington, D.C.

History
The building was designed by Charles Zeller Klauder and the Office of the Supervising Architect under Louis A. Simon, in the Stripped Classical style in 1939.  The building has Egyptian elements as well.

Construction was completed in 1940, but Social Security did not become the building's first occupant.  Instead, the threat of war created a need for space for defense agencies, and the building was made available to the War Department and the National Defense Commission. After the war, the Federal Security Agency, under which the Social Security Board had been placed in 1939, moved into the building. In 1953, FSA's successor, the Department of Health, Education and Welfare, part of which became the Department of Health and Human Services in 1980, became the primary occupant.

On April 28, 1988, the building was renamed the Wilbur J. Cohen Federal Building in honor of the Social Security Board's first professional employee and the former Secretary of Health, Education and Welfare. On July 6, 2007, the building was added to the National Register of Historic Places. Voice of America and the U.S. Agency for Global Media are the building's principal occupants.  VOA has been headquartered in the building since 1954.

Gallery

See also
 Railroad Retirement Board Building – on the same block

References

External links
 

Government buildings completed in 1939
Government buildings on the National Register of Historic Places in Washington, D.C.
Egyptian Revival architecture in the United States
Southwest Federal Center
Federal buildings in the United States